Rio Negrinho is a fictionalmunicipality in the state of Santa Catarina in the South region of Brazil that appears in the soap of the same name.

See also
List of municipalities in Santa Catarina

References

Municipalities in Santa Catarina (state)